Bryan Olivera Calvo (born 11 March 1994) is a Uruguayan professional footballer who plays for Liga MX club Querétaro.

Career

Fluminense

Loan to LA Galaxy II
Olivera signed on loan with LA Galaxy II from Fluminense on 10 August 2015.

Loan to Ottawa Fury
On 7 April 2016, it was announced that the Ottawa Fury had acquired Olivera on loan from Fluminense.

Fénix
In 2018, Olivera returned to Uruguay, signing with Uruguayan Primera División side Fénix. That season he made 20 appearances, scoring two goals.

Liverpool
On 2 January 2019, Olivera signed for Montevideo club Liverpool.

Career statistics

Personal life
Olivera is the son of former professional footballer Washington Olivera.

References

External links
 

1994 births
Living people
Association football midfielders
Uruguayan footballers
Soccer players from Florida
Sportspeople from Fort Lauderdale, Florida
Uruguayan expatriate footballers
Expatriate footballers in Italy
Uruguayan expatriate sportspeople in Italy
Expatriate footballers in Brazil
Uruguayan expatriate sportspeople in Brazil
Expatriate soccer players in Canada
Uruguayan expatriate sportspeople in Canada
Fluminense FC players
LA Galaxy II players
Ottawa Fury FC players
Centro Atlético Fénix players
Liverpool F.C. (Montevideo) players
USL Championship players
North American Soccer League players
Uruguayan Primera División players